General Bliss may refer to:

Stephen M. Bliss (fl. 1960s–2010s), U.S. Army brigadier general
Tasker H. Bliss (1853–1930), U.S. Army general
Zenas Bliss (1835–1900), Union Army major general